Ascension or ascending may refer to:

Religion 
 "Ascension", "Assumption", or "Translation", the belief in some religions that some individuals have ascended into Heaven without dying first
 Ascension of Jesus
 Feast of the Ascension (Ascension day), an annual day of feast commemorating Jesus' ascension; a public holiday in several countries
 The Ascension, another title for the Old English poem Christ II
 Ascension Cathedral (disambiguation)
 The Ascension, Lavender Hill, an Anglo-Catholic church on Lavender Hill, Battersea, South West London

Places 
 Ascensión Municipality, Chihuahua, Mexico
 Ascensión, Chihuahua, a city and capital of the municipality
 Ascension Island, in the southern Atlantic Ocean
 Ascension Islands, a group of uninhabited islands in Canada
 Ascension, Prince Edward Island, Canada
 L'Ascension, Quebec, Canada
 Ascension Parish, Louisiana, United States

Fiction
 Ascension (comics), a comic book series (1997–2000) created by David Finch
 Ascension (Star Wars novel), 2011

Film and TV 
 The Climb (2017 film), a French adventure film
 Dracula II: Ascension, a 2003 direct-to-video American-Romanian horror film
 Ascension, an award-winning short film produced by Vickie Gest
 Ascension (miniseries), a television miniseries that aired in December 2014
 "Ascension" (The X-Files), a 1994 episode of The X-Files
 "Ascension", a 1999 episode of Batman Beyond
 Ascension (Stargate), in the Stargate universe, a process to become a noncorporeal entity on a higher plane of existence (first mentioned in season 3, 2000)
 "Ascension" (Stargate SG-1), a 2001 Stargate SG-1 episode
 "Ascension", a 2013 episode of NCIS: Los Angeles
 Ascension (Agents of S.H.I.E.L.D.), a 2016 Agents of S.H.I.E.L.D. episode
 David Blaine Ascension, a stunt by David Blaine in Page, Arizona, September 2, 2020
 Ascension (film), a 2021 American documentary film

Games 
 Mage: The Ascension, a role-playing game
 Ultima IX: Ascension, the final part of the computer role-playing game series Ultima
 God of War: Ascension, a 2013 game for the PlayStation 3
 Ascension: Chronicle of the Godslayer, a 2011 deck-building card game
 A game map in Zombie Mode in Call of Duty: Black Ops, from the "First Strike" map pack

Music 
 L'Ascension, a suite for orchestra or organ by Olivier Messiaen
 Ascension, an alias used by the British trance music act The Space Brothers

Albums 
 Ascension (A Flock of Seagulls album), 2018
 Ascension (Djam Karet album), 2001
 Ascension (Jesu album), 2011
 Ascension (John Coltrane album), 1966
 Ascension (Misia album), 2007
 Ascension (Pep Love album), 2001
 The Ascension (2face Idibia album), 2014
 The Ascension (Glenn Branca album), 1981
 The Ascension (Otep album), 2007
 The Ascension (Phil Wickham album), 2013
 The Ascension (Sufjan Stevens album), 2020
 Ascension, by Michael Pinnella, 2014
 Ascension, by Toya Delazy, 2014
 The Afterman: Ascension, by progressive rock band Coheed and Cambria, 2012

Songs 
 "Ascension" (Gorillaz song), by Gorillaz from Humanz, 2017
 "Ascension (Don't Ever Wonder)", by Maxwell from Maxwell's Urban Hang Suite, 1996
 "Ascension," the only song featured in the 1966 John Coltrane album Ascension
 "Ascension," a song by Enslaved from Isa, 2004
 "Ascension", by John Frusciante from Curtains, 2005
 "Ascension", by Mac Miller from GO:OD AM, 2015
 "Ascension", by Vanessa Carlton from Liberman, 2015
 "Ascension", by Killswitch Engage from Incarnate, 2016
 "The Ascension", by Manowar from Gods of War, 2007
 "Ascension (A)", by Sunn O))) from their album Pyroclasts, 2019

Ships 
 , a Royal Navy frigate in service from 1944 to 1946
 MV Ascension, a 1993 cargo and container ship

Other 
 Ascension (Calvo), an outdoor 1996 sculpture by Robert Calvo, in Portland, Oregon
 Ascension (Wercollier), 1978 and 1986 sculptures by Lucien Wercollier
 Ascension (healthcare system), a Catholic non-profit health system in the United States
 Ascension (publisher), A Catholic media publisher
 Ascension Road, Prince Edward Island Route 160, a highway in Canada
 The Ascension (professional wrestling), a WWE wrestling tag team

See also 
 Ascend (disambiguation)
 Assumption of Mary, Mother of Jesus, into Heaven
 Asunción
 Asunción (disambiguation)
 Mi'raj, heavenly ascent of the Islamic prophet Muhammad
 Right ascension, half of an astronomical coordinate system